Lake Öreg (meaning "old lake") is a lake near Tata, Hungary.

Location 
The lake is situated in the middle of the town of Tata. Adjoining the South-east quarter of the lake is a wooded area. It is fed by the Által-brook from the south-east, which then leaves it in a Northerly direction through the town until it eventually reaches the Danube. 

On the lake's shores lie Tata Castle and the Esterházy Palace.

References

External links
 National Geographic

Oreg